is a Japanese footballer currently playing as a winger for Westerlo on loan from Urawa Red Diamonds of J1 League.

Career
He rejoined Urawa Red Diamonds, with whom he spent part of his youth career with, in 2022.

In January 2023, Matsuo joined Belgian First Division A club Westerlo on loan until 31 December 2023.

Career statistics

Club
.

Notes

References

External links

1997 births
Living people
Japanese footballers
Association football midfielders
J1 League players
J2 League players
Yokohama FC players
Urawa Red Diamonds players
K.V.C. Westerlo players
Japanese expatriate footballers
Expatriate footballers in Belgium
Japanese expatriate sportspeople in Belgium